Malcolm X: A Life of Reinvention is a biography of Malcolm X written by American historian Manning Marable. It won the 2012 Pulitzer Prize for History.

Pulitzer.org described this as "an exploration of the legendary life and provocative views of one of the most significant African-Americans in U.S. history, a work that separates fact from fiction and blends the heroic and tragic." In the book, Marable concludes that Malcolm X exaggerated his early criminal career, and engaged in a homosexual relationship with a white businessman. He also concludes that some of the killers of Malcolm X are still alive and were never charged.

Reception
Malcolm X: A Life of Reinvention was nominated for the National Book Award, and The New York Times ranked it among the 10 Best Books of 2011. It was one of three nominees for the inaugural Andrew Carnegie Medal for Excellence in Nonfiction (2012) presented by the American Library Association for the best adult non-fiction. It was awarded the Pulitzer Prize for History in 2012. As of April 2011 the book had been among the top ten books of the best seller list of Amazon.com. According to Viking, the print run had increased to 70,000 from the original 46,000.

Henry Louis Gates Jr., a literary critic, admired the book and said "Manning Marable has written the definitive biography of this outrageously misrepresented figure. He has plumbed countless historical records to bring out what is there, not what is imagined."

Houston A. Baker, Jr., author of the book review "Malcolm X: A Life of Reinvention by Manning Marable" at the African American Review, wrote that the book "also finds itself under excoriating siege from a legion of detractors who count themselves admirers and disciples 'connected' with Malcolm X and his 'celebrity.'" Karl Evanzz, the author of The Judas Factor: The Plot to Kill Malcolm X, referred to Marable's book as an "abomination" and stated that "it is a cavalcade of innuendo and logical fallacy, and is largely reinvented from previous works on the subject". An online magazine, The Root, declined to publish Evanzz's review. Gates, the editor in chief of The Root, said that he had no role in the rejection of Evanzz's review. David Montgomery of The Washington Post stated that "most reviews have been far more positive than Evanzz’s."

Author and journalist Herb Boyd stated he found as many as 25 significant errors in the book, some of which he described as "absolutely egregious".

Marable's account has also been challenged in Jared Ball and Todd Steven Burroughs' book A Lie of Reinvention: Correcting Manning Marable’s Malcolm X. Ball has stated that Marable's book “is a corporate product, a simple commodity to be traded, but for more than money; it is a carefully constructed ideological assault on history, on radical politics, on historical and cultural memory, on the very idea of revolution.”

University of Chicago professor Michael Dawson defended Marable's biography, stating Marable had "precisely focused on some of the critical central questions confronting black and progressive politics."

Linwood X Cathcart, a former Nation of Islam minister, started a $50 million lawsuit against Marable's estate, Columbia University, and Viking Press, as a result of Marable's suggestions that Cathcart was involved in Malcolm X's murder. In the book Marable misspelled his name "Linward".

Ilyasah and Malaak Shabazz, daughters of Malcolm X, criticized the book's argument that there was possible infidelity and strain in the marriage between Malcolm X and Betty Shabazz; Ilyasah said that the marriage "was definitely faithful and devoted because my father was a man of impeccable integrity, and I think that most people, if they're not clear on anything, they're clear that he was moral and ethical and had impeccable character." In response to criticisms, Boyce Watkins wrote in The Tennessee Tribune that "the fact that a person is your greatest hero does not mean they cannot be critiqued" and regarding the criticism from Malcolm X's daughters he wrote that their response "is natural, given that every little girl in America wants to believe that her daddy can do no wrong."

Editions
The book was published in hardcover, paperback, audiobook and various ebook formats.

Television series
In August 2017, The Hollywood Reporter and Deadline Hollywood reported that the independent studio Critical Content was developing a television series based on Malcolm X: A Life of Reinvention with writer David Matthews. Professor Leith Mullings, the wife of Manning Marable, who wrote Malcolm X, was among those identified as consultants to the project.

References
 Baker, Houston A. "Malcolm X: A Life of Reinvention by Manning Marable (review)." African American Review, 2012, Volume 45, Spring/Summer 2012, Issue 1, pp. 239 – 244. Available at Project MUSE.

Notes

Further reading

External links

 Pulitzer page
 Malcolm X: Who was the man behind the legend? . Al Jazeera English, April 2011 (video, 25 min.) - Riz Khan discusses the book with 3 scholars

2011 non-fiction books
21st-century history books
Pulitzer Prize for History-winning works
Works about Malcolm X
Biographies about African-American people
Viking Press books